This is a list of the dates when African states were made colonies or protectorates of European powers and lost their independence.  It only deals with modern times, thus the expansion of the Ancient Greeks, Roman Empire, barbarian tribes, and Arabs into Africa is ignored.  A number of regions such as the Congo and the Sahara Desert had no organized states.

References

Date of colonization, List of African territories and states by
History of Africa